Mocha Fracture Zone (MFZ) is a fracture zone on the Nazca Plate off the coast of Mocha Island, Chile. Mocha Fracture Zone trends from the Valdivia Fracture Zone in the south to the Peru–Chile Trench axis 100 km west of Mocha Island.

See also
 Transform fault

Fracture zones
Seismic faults of Chile